The 1999–2000 season was Kilmarnock's second season in the Scottish Premier League. Kilmarnock also competed in the Scottish Cup, Scottish League Cup and the UEFA Cup.

Summary

Season
Kilmarnock finished ninth in the Scottish Premier League with 37 points. They reached the semi–final of the League Cup, losing to Celtic. Kilmarnock also reached the third round of the Scottish Cup, losing to Alloa Athletic and lost in the first round of the UEFA Cup to 1. FC Kaiserslautern.

Results and fixtures

Kilmarnock's score comes first

Scottish Premier League

UEFA Cup

Scottish League Cup

Scottish Cup

Player statistics

|}

Final league table

Division summary

Transfers

Players in

Players out

References

External links
 Kilmarnock 1999–2000 at Soccerbase.com (select relevant season from dropdown list)

Kilmarnock F.C. seasons
Dundee